The Battle of Bagradas, the Bagradas, or the Bagradas River (the ancient name of the Medjerda) may refer to:

 Battle of the Bagradas River (255 BC), also known as the Battle of Tunis, during the First Punic War
 Battle of the Bagradas River (240 BC), also known as the Battle of the Macar, during the Mercenary War
 Battle of the Bagradas River (203 BC), usually known as the Battle of the Great Plains, during the Second Punic War
 Battle of the Bagradas River (49 BC), a battle during the Roman civil war between Caesar and Pompey
 Battle of the Bagradas River (536), a battle between the rebel leader Stotzas and Byzantine commander Belisarius